Khalid Shahanshah (Urdu: خالد شهنشاه ) was a Pakistani official who served as security chief of President Benazir Bhutto's residence. He was also a close advisor to President Asif Ali Zardari.

In 2002, Shahanshah participated in the elections for a seat in the National Assembly of Pakistan.
 He have three kids, one daughter and 2 son, eldest khizer than Hamza than Khadija. His wife and their children live in Usa.

References 

Pakistan People's Party politicians
Peoples Students Federation
Al-Zulfiqar
Muhajir people
2008 deaths
Security guards
Politicians from Karachi
Year of birth missing